Yumashevo (Yomaş) is a rural locality (a selo) and the administrative centre of Yumashevsky Selsoviet, Chekmagushevsky District, Bashkortostan, Russia. The population was 865 as of 2010. There are 8 streets.

Geography 
Yumashevo is located 30 km southwest of Chekmagush (the district's administrative centre) by road. Novosemenkino is the nearest rural locality.

References 

Rural localities in Chekmagushevsky District